Dion Cope is an Australian former rugby league footballer who played for the Cronulla Sharks and North Queensland Cowboys in the 1990s. He primarily played .

Playing career
In Round 20 of the 1995 ARL season, Cope made his first grade debut for the Cronulla Sharks in their 48–18 win over the Parramatta Eels at Parramatta Stadium. In 1996, Cope played four games for the Sharks, all off the bench.

In 1999, Cope played for the Easts Tigers in the Queensland Cup.

Statistics

ARL/Super League
 Statistics are correct to the end of the 1997 season

References

Living people
Australian rugby league players
Cronulla-Sutherland Sharks players
North Queensland Cowboys players
Eastern Suburbs Tigers players
Rugby league centres
Rugby league wingers
Year of birth missing (living people)